This is a list of all United States Supreme Court cases from volume 453 of the United States Reports:

External links

1981 in United States case law